Buckby is a surname. Notable people with the surname include:

 Jack Buckby (born 1993), British activist
 Malcolm Buckby (born 1951), Australian politician

See also
 Buckbee
 Long Buckby

English-language surnames
Surnames of English origin
Surnames of British Isles origin